Daniel 'Dani' Castellano Betancor (born 2 November 1987) is a Spanish professional footballer who plays as a midfielder or a left-back.

Club career
Born in Las Palmas, Canary Islands, Castellano graduated from UD Las Palmas' youth setup, and made his senior debut with the reserves in 2006, in Tercera División. On 15 December 2007 he appeared in his first game as a professional, starting in a 3–1 away loss against Polideportivo Ejido in the Segunda División.

On 31 January 2008, Castellano moved to another reserve team, RCD Mallorca B also in the fourth tier. He first appeared with the main squad on 8 January of the following year, coming on as a late substitute in a 3–1 home win over UD Almería in the Copa del Rey. Eight days later, he was loaned to Segunda División B club Deportivo Alavés until June.

After another loan stint at AD Ceuta, Castellano terminated his contract with the Balearic Islands side in June 2011. Late in the month, he returned to his first club Las Palmas after agreeing to a three-year deal.

Castellano played 12 games in the 2014–15 campaign, helping to a return to La Liga after 13 years. He made his debut in the competition on 22 August 2015, starting and featuring 80 minutes in a 1–0 defeat at Atlético Madrid.

Personal life
Castellano's twin brother, Javier, is also a footballer and a midfielder. He too represented Las Palmas.

References

External links
Las Palmas official profile 

1987 births
Living people
Spanish twins
Twin sportspeople
Spanish footballers
Footballers from Las Palmas
Association football defenders
Association football midfielders
Association football utility players
La Liga players
Segunda División players
Segunda División B players
Tercera División players
UD Las Palmas Atlético players
UD Las Palmas players
RCD Mallorca B players
RCD Mallorca players
Deportivo Alavés players
AD Ceuta footballers
Super League Greece players
Atromitos F.C. players
Spanish expatriate footballers
Expatriate footballers in Greece
Spanish expatriate sportspeople in Greece